Verne C. Harnish is founder of the Young Entrepreneurs' Organization (YEO), now known as Entrepreneurs' Organization, and the Association of Collegiate Entrepreneurs. He also serves as co-founder and principal of Growth Institute and as founder and chief executive officer of Scaling Up.

Education
Harnish received a bachelor's degree in mechanical engineering and an M.B.A. from Wichita State University, where he founded and chaired the Association of Collegiate Entrepreneurs.

Professional
He chairs the "Birthing of Giants" leadership program at the Massachusetts Institute of Technology and the MIT/WEO Advanced Business Program for entrepreneurs over 40.

Writing career
Harnish is an author of the following six books:

 Mastering the Rockefeller Habits (2002)
The Greatest Business Decisions of All-Time (2012)
 Scaling Up: How a Few Companies Make It...and Why the Rest Don't (2014)
 Scaling Up Compensation. 5 Design Principles for Turning Your Largest Expense into a Strategic Advantage co-author Sebastian Ross (2022)
 20th Anniversary Edition of Mastering the Rockefeller Habits (2022)
 Scaling Up: How a Few Companies Make It...and Why the Rest Don't (Rockefeller Habits 2.0 Revised Edition) (2022)

References

External links
 Bio at Gazelles.com
 Verne Harnish at BusinessNews.com.au

Living people
American business writers
Place of birth missing (living people)
Wichita State University alumni
1959 births